KOBY (940 AM) was an American radio station broadcasting an Oldies format. It was licensed to Cedar City, Utah.

The license and the callsign have been deleted by the U.S. Federal Communications Commission.

History
The station used to be known as KBRE, and then KNNZ, beginning on May 25, 2001.  On February 24, 2009, while off air, the station changed its call sign to KOBY.

On May 29, 2009, the Fifth District Court of Utah in Washington County, Utah, appointed a receiver to take over KOBY for US Capital, Incorporated of Boulder, Colorado, an investment group which foreclosed on Legecy Media, the owners of KOBY and several other stations. The receiver turned the license in to the FCC and requested it be canceled pursuant to court approval. It was cancelled on November 9, 2012.

References

External links

FCC History Cards for KOBY

Defunct radio stations in the United States
BOY
Oldies radio stations in the United States
Radio stations established in 1971
Radio stations disestablished in 2012
1971 establishments in Utah
2012 disestablishments in Utah
OBY